Lawrence Alfred Landrian, later Landriau (30 December 1894 – 19 March 1966), was a Canadian rower. He competed in the men's coxed four event at the 1920 Summer Olympics.

References

External links
 

1894 births
1966 deaths
Canadian male rowers
Olympic rowers of Canada
Rowers at the 1920 Summer Olympics
Rowers from Ontario